Romania competed at the 2017 World Championships in Athletics in London, Great Britain, from 4–13 August 2017.

Results
(q – qualified, NM – no mark, SB – season best)

Men
Track and road events

Field events

Women
Track and road events

Field events

References

Nations at the 2017 World Championships in Athletics
World Championships in Athletics
Romania at the World Championships in Athletics